The Diplomatic Quarter (DQ), also known by its Arabic name as-Safarat, is a diplomatic enclave and an affluent residential district in northwestern Riyadh, Saudi Arabia, in close proximity to Irqah. Spanned across 800 hectares, it hosts most of the foreign embassies and some of the government departments in the city besides being a popular tourist attraction. Until November 2018, it was administered by the Irqah Sub-Municipality before the district's responsibility was placed under the newly created Diplomatic Quarter General Authority.

History
The Diplomatic Quarter was established on November 25, 1975, through a Council of Ministers resolution during the reign of King Khalid upon the relocation of the headquarters of the Ministry of Foreign Affairs from Jeddah to Riyadh. It was the brainchild of Riyadh's then governor Prince Salman bin Abdulaziz al-Saud. On 27 November 2018, a royal decree issued by King Salman instructed the creation of the Diplomatic Quarter Authority which would be independent of Riyadh Municipality's Irqah Sub-Municipality and would be responsible for the administration of the district. In February 2021, the authority was abolished and its administration was transferred to the Royal Commission for Riyadh City.

Landmarks
 Tuwaiq Palace
 Oud Square

Schools
 King Faisal School
 British International School, DQ campus

Parks
 Al Khuzama Park (The Groves)
 Richard Bodeker Park
 Yamama Park 
 Rock Park

Hotels
 Marriott Riyadh Diplomatic Quarter
 Radisson Blu Hotel and Residence

Marketplaces
 Al-Kindi Plaza
 Tamimi Markets DQ branch 
 Al Fazari Plaza

References

1975 establishments in Saudi Arabia
Neighbourhoods in Riyadh
Foreign relations of Saudi Arabia